Vezirhan is a town (belde) and municipality in the Bilecik District, Bilecik Province, Turkey. Its population is 2,907 (2021). The name of the town refers to a caravansarai in the town.

Geography

History
The town is very near to Söğüt where the Ottoman Empire was founded, but earliest reliable documents about the town go back to the 17th century. According to these documents, the settlement was a part of Köprülü Mehmet Pasha’s  (an Ottoman Grand Vizier) possessions in 1661. The Pasha commissioned a complex in the town which constituted a caravansarai, a mosque, a Turkish bath, a drinking water well and a bridge over the river. These were dedicated to travellers from İstanbul to Central Anatolia. There was also a church, a sign of Greek presence.  But during the compulsory population exchange between Greece and Turkey in 1920s, they left the town.

Economy
The main economic activities are agriculture and animal husbandry. But there are also some factories around the town such as paper, ceramics and moulding.

References

Populated places in Bilecik District
Towns in Turkey